The 2020 Dubai Women's Tour was a women's cycle stage race held in Dubai from 17 to 20 February, 2020. The Dubai Women's Tour, being held for the first time, was held as a UCI rating of 2.2 race.

Route

Classification leadership table

References

Cycle races